Lotanna is a 2017 Nigerian crime drama film, directed by Toka McBaror. The film stars Chris Okagbue as the title character. The film had its worldwide release on April 8, 2017, at Eko Hotel and Suites, Lagos, Nigeria. The original soundtrack for the film was done by Naeto C and Praiz, and was well received by film critics as a high-point in the film.

Cast 
Liz Benson as Efya
Jide Kosoko as Benson
Ama Abebrese as Zara
Victor Olaotan as Manny
Victor Decker as Don Clef
Bimbo Manuel as Faraday Ojukwu
Chris Okagbue as Lotanna
Chris Attoh as Kojo
Meg Otanwa as Mama Clara

Plot

Reception 
Isaballa Akinseye for Vanguard, praised the soundtrack, photography and costume but felt the story, directing, acting, editing and special effects were below par. It got a 58% rating from Nollywood Reinvented, who gave a general consensus that "On a very plain level, Lotanna is a good movie but for what it could have been, it never truly achieves this". It was recommended as one of ten films to watch by The Cable. Wilfred Okiche for 360nobs was impressed with the recreation of the 1970s in the film, but was unimpressed by the body language of "Lotanna" and "Zara", as well as the acting of the "big names", it concluded its review by describing the film experience as "completely forgettable".

See also
 List of Nigerian films of 2017

References

External links
 

Films set in the 1970s
Nigerian musical drama films
2010s musical drama films
Films set in the 20th century
English-language Nigerian films
Films about Alzheimer's disease
2010s English-language films